Państwowa Wyższa Szkoła Zawodowa (State Higher Vocational School) is a type of vocational university in Poland.

Universities and colleges in Poland